Jassim Abdul-Rahman Mandi (born December 16, 1944 in Manama) is a former football referee from the Asian state of Bahrain. He is known to have officiated the 1988 Summer Olympics in Seoul, South Korea.
He has refereed the following international games:
(1985) World Cup Youth Final, Moscow
(1988) Olympics, Seoul, Korea
(1989) World Cup Qualifiers, Italy
(1990) World Cup Final, Italy

References

External links
Profile

1944 births
Living people
People from Manama
Bahraini football referees
Olympic football referees
AFC Asian Cup referees